Taranis percarinata is a species of sea snail, a marine gastropod mollusk in the family Raphitomidae.

Description
The length of the shell attains 2.2 mm.

Distribution
This marine species was found off Palawan Island, the Philippines at a depth of 7 m.

References

 Powell, A.W.B. 1967. The family Turridae in the Indo-Pacific. Part 1a. The Turrinae concluded. Indo-Pacific Mollusca 1(7): 409-443, pls 298-317

External links
 
 gastropods.com: Taranis percarinata

percarinata
Gastropods described in 1967